Billy Munro (28 September 1918 - 12 September 1970) was a Scotland international rugby union player who played at centre.

Rugby Union career

Amateur career

Munro played for Glasgow HSFP.

Provincial career

Munro played for Glasgow District.

International career

He was capped a total of two times for the Scotland international team. Both caps were in 1947.

References

Sources

 Bath, Richard (ed.) The Scotland Rugby Miscellany (Vision Sports Publishing Ltd, 2007 )
 Cotton, Fran (Ed.) (1984) The Book of Rugby Disasters & Bizarre Records. Compiled by Chris Rhys. London. Century Publishing. 
 Jones, J.R. Encyclopedia of Rugby Union Football (Robert Hale, London, 1976 )
 Massie, Allan A Portrait of Scottish Rugby (Polygon, Edinburgh)

1918 births
1970 deaths
Scottish rugby union players
Scotland international rugby union players
Glasgow HSFP players
Glasgow District (rugby union) players
Rugby union centres